Amar Shahid Bandhu Singh Shrinet was a guerrilla who fought against the British Raj in India.

Bandhu Singh was born on 1 May 1833 in a Shrinet Rajput Zamindar family of Babu Shiv Prasad Singh of Dumari Riyasat. He had five brothers named Dal Hamman Singh, Tejai Singh, Fateh Singh, Jheenak Singh and Karia Singh. He was a devotee of Tarkulaha Devi. He was finally arrested by the British along with Shivgobind Chand of Chillupar, Gorakhpur. He was hanged publicly at Ali Nagar Chauraha in Gorakhpur on 12 August 1858 but luckily Shivgobind Chand escaped to Nepal to his daughter Samrajya Laxmi Devi of Nepal. There is a month-long Mela (funfair) every year starting from Chaitra Ramnavami at the Tarkulaha Devi Temple. People from far-flung locations visit 
Amar Shahid was a freedom fighter ‘Tarkulaha Mela’ to shop for their annual requirements of Garam Masala (Indian Spices) and to enjoy the traditional ‘Nautanki’ (drama), Nag Kanya shows and small circuses. Also, Tarkulaha Devi Temple was Shaheed Bandhu Singh's favourite place.

References 

https://web.archive.org/web/20130328004157/http://www.gorakhpurcityinfo.com/Gorakhpur-Resource/Tarkulhadevi.aspx

1833 births
1857 deaths
Indian Hindus
Indian independence activists from Uttar Pradesh
People from Gorakhpur
Revolutionaries of the Indian Rebellion of 1857